Lars Roar Bohinen (born 8 September 1969) is a Norwegian football manager and former professional footballer.

As a player, he was a midfielder from 1986 until 2005, notably playing in the Premier League for Nottingham Forest, Blackburn Rovers and Derby County, as well as spells with Bærum SK, Lyn Oslo, Vålerenga, Viking, BSC Young Boys, Lillestrøm, Lyngby and Farum. He was capped 49 times by Norway, scoring ten goals and being part of their World Cup 1994 squad.

He has since moved into coaching, and after spells on the staff at Vålerenga and Stabæk, he has gone on to be the first team manager of Asker, Sandefjord, Aalesund, Sarpsborg 08 and Stabæk

Club career
Bohinen was born in Vadsø, Finnmark, in far northeastern Norway near the Soviet border in the Arctic. Nevertheless, he never played first team football in Finnmark. His first professional club was Vålerenga, and he played for Viking, Young Boys Bern, Nottingham Forest, Blackburn Rovers, Derby County
Lyngby F.C. and Nordsjælland.

Bohinen is perhaps best well known in England for his time with Nottingham Forest. He moved from Young Boys to Frank Clark's Nottingham Forest for a £450,000 fee in 1993. He joined Forest at a time when they were struggling in the first division of English Football, and a clause in his contract meant that he could leave at any time if another club matched a £700,000 buyout fee. After gaining promotion to the Premier League with Forest, Bohinen stayed there for another season which included some famous goals for the Norwegian, most notably a 30-yard chip at White Hart Lane in a 4–1 victory for Forest against Tottenham Hotspur.

In 1995 English champions Blackburn matched the £700,000 buyout clause in his contract and Bohinen moved to Ewood Park, signing a three-year contract. His first season was a success as he became a regular in the Blackburn side, scoring four league goals - including a double against his old club as Rovers thrashed Forest 7–0. Opportunities became more limited upon Roy Hodgson's arrival in 1997, as the new manager preferred more defensive-minded central midfielders.

Bohinen joined Derby County from Blackburn in March 1998 for £1.45 million. He had his contract cancelled by the club in January 2001, having scored just once in a 3–1 away defeat against Crystal Palace in April 1998.

International career
Bohinen made his debut for the Norway national team in 1989 and earned 49 caps, scoring 10 goals. He once refused to play for Norway against France in protest after the French Army started carrying out nuclear tests in the South Pacific.

Coaching career
After he retired from footballing, Bohinen became assistant coach for Vålerenga in Oslo, Norway, but later quit the job. He later became sporting director in Stabæk, but resigned in April 2009. He has gone on to be the first team manager of Asker, Sandefjord, Aalesund, Sarpsborg 08 and Stabæk.

Personal life
Bohinen is of Kven descent.

He is a cousin of Sigurd Rushfeldt and the father of Emil Bohinen.

In 2011, Bohinen finished third on the television show Skal vi danse?, the Norwegian version of Strictly Come Dancing.

Managerial statistics

References

External links

 
 

1969 births
Living people
People from Vadsø
Sportspeople from Bærum
Norwegian footballers
Norwegian people of Kven descent
Norway international footballers
Norway youth international footballers
Norway under-21 international footballers
Bærum SK players
Lyn Fotball players
Vålerenga Fotball players
Viking FK players
BSC Young Boys players
Lillestrøm SK players
Nottingham Forest F.C. players
Blackburn Rovers F.C. players
Derby County F.C. players
Lyngby Boldklub players
FC Nordsjælland players
Eliteserien players
Premier League players
Danish Superliga players
1994 FIFA World Cup players
Expatriate footballers in Switzerland
Expatriate footballers in England
Expatriate men's footballers in Denmark
Norwegian expatriate footballers
Norwegian expatriate sportspeople in Switzerland
Norwegian expatriate sportspeople in England
Norwegian expatriate sportspeople in Denmark
Association football midfielders
Vålerenga Fotball non-playing staff
Norwegian football managers
Sandefjord Fotball managers
Aalesunds FK managers
Sarpsborg 08 FF managers
Stabæk Fotball managers
Eliteserien managers